Antal Steer (born 10 October 1943) is a Hungarian wrestler. He competed at the 1968 Summer Olympics and the 1972 Summer Olympics.

References

External links
 
 
 

1943 births
Living people
Hungarian male sport wrestlers
Olympic wrestlers of Hungary
Wrestlers at the 1968 Summer Olympics
Wrestlers at the 1972 Summer Olympics
Sportspeople from Bratislava